This is a list of notable Buddhists, encompassing all the major branches of the religion (i.e. in Buddhism), and including interdenominational and eclectic Buddhist practitioners. This list includes both formal teachers of Buddhism, and people notable in other areas who are publicly Buddhist or who have espoused Buddhism.

Philosophers and founders of schools 
Individuals are grouped by nationality, except in cases where their influence was felt elsewhere. Gautama Buddha and his immediate disciples ('Buddhists') are listed separately from later Indian Buddhist thinkers, teachers and contemplatives.

Buddha's disciples and early Buddhists

 Gautama Buddha, Siddhārtha Gautama

Clergy
 Ānanda, the Buddha's cousin, personal attendant of the Buddha and a chief disciple
 Aṅgulimāla, serial killer who attained to sainthood after renouncing wickedness
 Anuruddhā, one of the ten principal disciples
 Aśvajit, one of the first five disciples of the Buddha
 Bharika, one of the first five disciples of the Buddha
 Devadatta, another cousin of Siddhārtha and later rival who attempted to assassinate the Buddha
 Gavāṃpati
 Gayākāśyapa
 Kālodayin
 Maha Kapphina
 Kātyāyana, foremost in explaining the Dharma
 Kaundinya (also known as Kondañña or Ājñātakauṇḍinya), the first arhat and one of the first five disciples of the Buddha
 Khemā, a chief of the women disciples
 Kisā Gautamī
 Koṣṭhila
 Mahākāśyapa
 Mahākauṣṭhila, foremost in eloquence
 Mahānāman, one of the first five disciples of the Buddha
 Mahāprajāpatī Gautamī, Buddha's aunt and foster mother, as well as the first woman to be ordained
 Maudgalyāyana, one of two chief disciples of the Buddha
 Nanda, younger half-brother of the Buddha
 Nandika
 Nadīkāśyapa
 Paṭācārā
 Pilindavatsa
 Piṇḍola Bhāradvāja
 Pūrṇamaitrāyaṇīputra, one of the ten principal disciples
 Rāhula, son of Siddhārtha and Yasodharā
 Revata
 Śāriputra one of two chief disciples of the Buddha
 Subhūti, one of the ten principal disciples
 Śuddhipanthakena
 Suvāhu
 Sundarī Nandā, the Buddha's half-sister
 Sunīta, a low-caste man who reached enlightenment
 Upāli, foremost disciple in knowledge of the Vinaya
 Utpalavarṇā
 Uruvilvākāśyapa
 Vāgīśa
 Vakkula
 Vāṣpa, one of the first five disciples of the Buddha
 Yasodharā, Siddhārtha's wife before he renounced the palace life

Laity
 Amrapali, royal courtesan
 Anathapindika, wealthy merchant and banker
 Ajātasattu, king of Magadha, son of Bimbisāra
 Bimbisāra, king of Magadha
 Chandaka, prince Siddhārtha's charioteer
 Citta, wealthy merchant
 Cunda Kammāraputta, a smith who gave the Buddha his last meal
 Hastaka Āṭavika, saved by the Buddha from a demon
 Kubjottarā, a chief woman disciple and servant of Queen Śyāmāvatī
 Pasenadi, King of Kosala
 Samavati, a queen of Kauśāmbī
 Śuddhodana, the Buddha's father
 Velukantakiyā
 Viśākhā, an aristocratic woman and chief female patron

Later Indian Buddhists (after Buddha)

 Aryadeva, foremost disciple of Nagarjuna, continued the philosophical school of Madhyamaka
 Aśvaghoṣa,  Sarvāstivāda Buddhist philosopher, dramatist, poet and orator from India
 Atiśa, holder of the "mind training" teachings, considered an indirect founder of the Gelug school of Tibetan Buddhism
 Bhāviveka, early expositor of the Svatantrika branch of the Madhyamaka school
 Bodhidharma, founder of Chan Buddhism
 Bodhiruci, patriarch of the Dilun school
 Batuo, founding abbot and patriarch of the Shaolin Monastery
 Buddhaghosa, Theravadin commentator
 Buddhapālita, early expositor of the Prasaṅgika branch of the Madhyamaka school
 Chandragomin, renowned grammarian
 Candrakīrti, considered the greatest exponent of Prasaṅgika
 Dharmakirti, famed logician, author of the Seven Treatises; student of Dignāga's student, Īśvārasēna; said to have debated famed Hindu scholar Adi Shankara
 Dignāga, famed logician
 Kamalaśīla (8th century), author of important texts on meditation
 Kumārajīva,  Buddhist monk, scholar, missionary and translator from the Kingdom of Kucha, Central Asia
 Luipa, one of the eighty-four tantric Mahasiddhas
 Nagarjuna, founder of the Madhyamaka school, widely considered the most important Mahayana philosopher (with Asanga)
 Nadapada (Tibetan: Naropa), Tilopa's primary disciple, teacher of Marpa the Translator and Khungpo Nyaljor
 Saraha, famed mahasiddha, forefather of the Kagyu lineage
 Śāntarakṣita, abbot of Nalanda, founder of the Yogacara who helped Padmasambhava establish Buddhism in Tibet
 Shantideva (8th century), author of the Bodhisattvacaryāvatāra
 Śīlabhadra, Buddhist monk and philosopher and erstwhile abbot of Nālandā University in India
 Tilopa, recipient of four separate transmissions from Nagarjuna, Nagpopa, Luipa, and Khandro Kalpa Zangmo; Naropa's teacher

From Gandhara
 Asanga, founder of the Yogacara school, widely considered the most important Mahayana philosopher along with Nagarjuna
 Garab Dorje, Indian founder of Dzogchen (Great Perfection) tradition
 Vasubandhu, author of the Abhidharmakōśa and various Yogacara treatises; these may or may not be the same person
 Padmasambhava (Tibetan: Guru Rinpoche), Indian founder of Tibetan Buddhism

Indo-Greek
 Dharmaraksita (3rd century BCE), Greek Buddhist missionary sent by emperor Ashoka, and a teacher of the monk Nagasena
 Mahadharmaraksita (2nd century BCE), Greek Buddhist master during the time of Menander
 Nāgasena (2nd century BCE), Buddhist sage questioned about Buddhism by Milinda, the Indo-Greek king in the Milinda Pañha

Central Asian
 An Shigao, Parthian monk and the first known Buddhist missionary to China, in 148 CE
 Dharmarakṣa, Yuezhi monk, the first known translator of the Lotus Sutra into Chinese
 Jñānagupta (561–592), monk and translator from Gandhara, Pakistan
 Kumārajīva (c. 401), Kuchan monk and one of the most important translators
 Lokaksema, Kushan monk from Gandhara, first translator of Mahayana scriptures into Chinese, around 180 CE
Prajñā (c. 810), monk and translator from Gandhara, who translated important texts into Chinese and educated the Japanese Kūkai in Sanskrit texts

Chinese

 Baizhang Huaihai, Zen Buddhist master of Tang dynasty
 Bodhidharma, first patriarch of Chan Buddhism in China
 Dahui Zonggao, 12th-century kōan master
 Daman Hongren, fifth patriarch of Chan Buddhism in China
 Dayi Daoxin, fourth patriarch of Chan Buddhism in China
 Dazu Huike, second patriarch of Chan Buddhism in China
 Faxian, translator and pilgrim
 Fazang, the third of the five patriarchs of the Huayan school of Mahayana Buddhism, of which he is traditionally considered the founder.
 Guifeng Zongmi, fifth patriarch of the Huayan school
 Hong Yi, calligraphist, painter, master of seal carving
 Huangbo Xiyun, 9th-century teacher of Linji Yixuan
 Huineng, sixth and last patriarch of Chan Buddhism in China
 Ingen, 17th-century Chinese Chan monk, founder of the Ōbaku sect of Zen
 Ji Gong, Buddhist monk revered as a deity in Taoism
 Jizang, founder of East Asian Mādhyamaka
 Jnanayasas, translator
 Linji Yixuan, 9th-century Chinese monk, founder of the Linji school of Chan Buddhism
 Mazu Daoyi, 8th-century Chan master
 Moheyan, 8th-century Chinese monk, advocate of "sudden" enlightenment
 Sanghapala, 6th-century monk (Mon-Khmer?) who translated many texts to Chinese
 Sengcan, third patriarch of Chan Buddhism in China
 Wumen Huikai, author of the Gateless Gate
 Xuanzang, brought Yogacara to China to found the East Asian Yogācāra school; significant pilgrim, translator
 Xueting Fuyu, 13th-century Shaolin Monastery abbot of the Caodong school
 Yijing, pilgrim and translator
 Yunmen Wenyan, founder of one of the five schools of Chan Buddhism
 Yuquan Shenxiu, Tang dynasty, patriarch of "Northern School" sect of Chan Buddhism
 Zhaozhou, 9th-century Chan master; noted for "Mu" koan
 Zhiyi, founder of the Tiantai school

Tibetan

 Gampopa, student of Jetsun Milarepa and founder of the Karma Kagyu lineage of Tibetan Buddhism
 Jigten Sumgön, founder of Drikung Kagyu Lineage
 Dolpopa Sherab Gyaltsen, founder of the Jonang school and advocate of the shentong philosophy
 Longchenpa, one of the greatest Nyingma philosophers
 Mandarava, important female student and consort of Padmasambhava
 Marpa Lotsawa, student of Naropa and a founder of the Kagyu lineage of Tibetan Buddhism
 Milarepa, foremost student of Marpa Lotsawa
 Padmasambhava, Gandharan founder of Nyingma school of Tibetan Buddhism
 Karmapa, the founder of Karma Kagyu or Kamtsang Kagyu lineage of Tibetan Buddhism
 Jamgon Kongtrul, Tibetan Buddhist scholar, artist, physician and polymath
 Sakya Pandita, one of the greatest Sakya philosophers
 Taranatha, important Jonang scholar
 Je Tsongkhapa, 14th-century Tibetan monk, founder of the Gelug school of Tibetan Buddhism, based upon the Kadam
 Yeshe Tsogyal, important female student and consort of Padmasambhava
 Rongzom Mahapandita, important Nyingma scholar and meditation master of Nyingma lineage of Tibetan Buddhism

Japanese

 Bankei Yōtaku (1622–1693), Zen master of the Rinzai school
 Dōgen Zenji (1200–1253), founder of the Sōtō school of Zen, based upon the Caodong school
 Eisai (1141–1215), travelled to China and returned to found the Rinzai school of Zen
 Hakuin Ekaku (1686–1769), Rinzai school of Zen
 Hōnen (1133–1212), founder of the Jōdo-shū school of Pure Land Buddhism
 Ikkyū (1374–1481), Zen Buddhist monk and poet
 Ippen (1234–1289), founder of the Ji-shū sect of Pure Land Buddhism
 Kūkai (774–835), founder of Shingon Buddhism
 Myōe (1173–1232), monk of Kegon and Shingon Buddhism, known for his propagation of the Mantra of Light
 Nakahara Nantenbō (1839–1925), Zen master and artist
 Nichiren (1222–1282), founder of Nichiren Buddhism
 Nikkō (1246–1333), founder of Nichiren Shōshū
 Rōben (689–773), invited Simsang to Japan and founded the Kegon tradition based upon the Korean Hwaeom school
 Ryōkan (1758–1831), Zen monk and poet
 Saichō (767–822), founded Tendai school in Japan, also known by the posthumous title Dengyō Daishi
 Shinran (1173–1263), founder of the Jōdo Shinshū school of Pure Land Buddhism and disciple of Hōnen
 Takuan Sōhō (1573–1645), Zen teacher, and, according to legend, mentor of the swordsman Miyamoto Musashi
 Gempō Yamamoto (1866–1961), Zen master
 Shinjō Itō (1906–1989), founder of Shinnyo-en

Korean

 Gihwa (1376–1433), Korean Seon monk; wrote commentaries on the Diamond Sutra and Sutra of Perfect Enlightenment
 Jinul, Korean Seon monk (1158–1210); founder of modern Korean gong'an meditation system
 Uisang (7th century), Korean monk, founder of Hwaeom tradition, based upon the Chinese Huayan school
 Woncheuk
 Wonhyo (617–668), Korean monk; prolific commentator on Mahayana sutras

Burmese
 Shin Arahan, primate of Pagan Kingdom, 1056–1115
 Ledi Sayadaw, propagator of Vipassanā
 Mahasi Sayadaw, propagator of Vipassanā
 Sayadaw U Tejaniya, propagator of Vipassanā
 Mogok Sayadaw, propagator of Vipassanā
 Webu Sayadaw, propagator of Vipassanā
 Panditarama Sayadaw, propagator of Vipassanā
 Mingun Sayadaw, first monk in Myanmar to be awarded the title of Tipitakadhara, meaning Keeper and Guardian of the Tipitaka
 Taunggwin Sayadaw, last Buddhist monk to hold the office as Thathanabaing of Burma
 Maha Bodhi Ta Htaung Sayadaw, founder of Maha Bodhi Tahtaung
 Thamanya Sayadaw, best known for his doctrinal emphasis on metta
 Sunlun Sayadaw, popular meditation teacher among the monks and Vipassanā meditation master
 Sitagu Sayadaw, founder and Supreme Head of the Sitagu Buddhist Academies
 Ashin Nandamalabhivamsa, rector of International Theravada Buddhist Missionary University
 Chanmyay Sayadaw, well-known monk and editor of the Buddhist Scriptures in Pali for reciting Buddhist scriptures at the Sixth Buddhist Council in Myanmar
 Taung Galay Sayadaw, Karen Theravadin Buddhist monk, and also known as a prolific writer and a historian
 Sayadaw U Narada, planted many thousands of Bodhi trees, built thousands of pagodas and Buddha statues
 Sayadaw U Pannavamsa, prominent Buddhist monk, known for his missionary work, particularly in Sri Lanka and Malaysia
 Ashin Sandadika, well-known monk
 Sayagyi U Ba Khin, propagator of vipassana meditation in the Ledi tradition

Thai

 Somdet Phra Buddhacarya (1788–1872), monk who was the preceptor and teacher of King Rama IV
 Ajahn Sao Kantasīlo (1861–1941), one of the pioneers of the Dhammayuttika Nikaya, mentor of Ajahn Mun 
 Ajahn Mun Bhūridatta (1870–1949), monk who established the Thai Forest Tradition or "Kammaṭṭhāna tradition"
 Khruba Siwichai (1878–1939), best known for the building of many temples during his time, his charismatic and personalistic character
 Luang Pu Sodh Candasaro (1884–1959), monk who founded the Dhammakaya Movement in the early 20th century
 Luang Pu Waen Suciṇṇo (1887–1985), first-generation student of the Thai Forest Tradition
 Somdet Phra Sangharaja Chao Krommaluang Jinavajiralongkorn (1897–1988), the 18th Supreme Patriarch of Thailand
 Phra Ajaan Thate Desaransi (1902–1994), first-generation student of the Thai Forest Tradition and one of the founding teachers of the lineage
 Buddhādasa Bhikkhu (1906–1993), famous and influential Thai ascetic-philosopher of the 20th century
 Ajahn Lee Dhammadharo (1907–1961), regarded as one of the great teachers and meditation masters of the Thai Forest Tradition
 Ajahn Maha Bua (1913–2011), well-known monk in the Thai Forest Tradition
 Somdet Phra Sangharaja Chao Krommaluang Vajirañāṇasaṃvara (1913–2013), the 19th Supreme Patriarch of Thailand
 Ajahn Fuang Jotiko (1915–1986), student of Ajahn Lee, well-known monk in the Thai Forest Tradition
 Ajahn Chah (1918–1992), monk well-known for his students from all over the world
 Ajahn Suwat Suvaco (1919–2002), student of Ajahn Funn and established four monasteries in the United States
 Phra Chanda Thawaro (1922–2012), student of Ajahn Mun, one of the best known Thai Buddhist monks of the late 20th and early 21st centuries
 Somdet Phra Ariyavongsagatanana IX (born 1927), the 20th and current Supreme Patriarch of Thailand, practitioner of the Thai Forest Tradition

Rulers and monarchs

 Anawrahta (1015–1078), founder of the Pagan Kingdom and credited with introducing Theravada Buddhism there and reintroducing it in Ceylon
 Ashoka (304–232 BC), Mauryan Emperor of ancient India, and the first Buddhist ruler to send Buddhist missionaries outside of India throughout the Old World 
 Brihadratha Maurya, last ruler of the Maurya Empire
 Bayinnaung Kyawhtin Nawrahta (1516–1581), king of the Toungoo Dynasty, assembled the largest empire in the history of Southeast Asia, viewed himself as the protector of Theravada Buddhism, and had long tried to promote and protect the religion in Ceylon, introduced more orthodox Theravada Buddhism to Upper Burma and the Shan states, prohibited all human and animal sacrifices throughout the kingdom
 Harsha (606–648), Indian emperor who converted to Buddhism
 Jayavarman VII (1181–1219), king of Cambodia
 Kanishka the Great, ruler of the Kushan Empire
 Kublai Khan, Mongol khagan and founder of the Yuan dynasty of China
 Hulagu Khan, Mongol ruler who conquered much of Southwest Asia, he converted to Buddhism on his deathbed, spending most of his life as a Nestorian Christian
 Menander I, 2nd century BCE, a king of the Indo-Greek Kingdom of Northwestern India who questioned Nāgasena about Buddhism in the Milinda Pañha and is said to have become an arhat
 Mindon Min (1808–1878), penultimate King of Burma and facilitator of the Fifth Buddhist council
 Emperor Ming of Han (28–75), born Liu Yang and also known as Liu Zhuang and as Han Mingdi, the second emperor of China's Eastern Han dynasty.
 Mongkut, king of Thailand and founder of the Dhammayuttika Nikaya
 Prince Shōtoku (574–622), mythologized crown prince and regent of Japan
 Theodorus (1st century BCE), Indo-Greek governor, author of a Buddhist dedication
 Wu Zetian (625–705), only female Empress Regnant in Chinese history
 Emperor Wu of Liang (502–549)
 Devanampiya Tissa of Anuradhapura (307 BCE–267 BCE), King of Anuradhapura
 Dutugamunu of Anuradhapura (161 BCE–131 BCE), King of Sri Lanka
 Bimbisar (544–492 BC), founder of Haryanka dynasty
 Ajātasattu (reign c. 492–460 BC), second emperor of Haryanka dynasty
 Udayin (460–444 BC), third emperor of Haryanka dynasty
 Pasenadi, King of Kosala

Modern teachers

Theravada teachers 

 Ajahn Amaro (born 1956)
Ajahn Buddhadasa Bhikkhu (1906–1993)
 Ajahn Brahm (born 1951)
 Ajahn Candasiri (born 1947)
 Ajahn Chah (1918–1992)
 Ajahn Anan (born 1954)
 Ajahn Achalo (born 1972)
 Ajahn Jayasaro (born 1958)
 Ajahn Khemadhammo (born 1944)
 Ajahn Mun Bhuridatta (1870–1949)
 Ajahn Pasanno (born 1949)
 Ajahn Sucitto (born 1949)
 Ajahn Sumedho (born 1934)
 Ajahn Sundara (born 1946)
 Ajahn Viradhammo (born 1947)
 Ayya Khema (1923–1997)
 Balangoda Ananda Maitreya Thero (1896–1998)
 Bhante Sujato (born 1966)
 Bhikkhu Anālayo (born 1962)
 Bhikkhu Bodhi (born 1944)
 Bhikkhu Kiribathgoda Gnanananda (born 1961)
 Bour Kry (born 1945)
 Charles Henry Allan Bennett (1872–1923)
 Dipa Ma (1911–1989)
 Godwin Samararatne (1932–2000)
 Hammalawa Saddhatissa (1914–1990)
 Henepola Gunaratana (born 1927)
 Jack Kornfield (born 1945)
 K. L. Dhammajoti (born 1949)
 K. Sri Dhammananda (1919–2006)
 Kirinde Sri Dhammaratana (born 1948)
 Ledi Sayadaw (1846–1923)
 Luangpor Thong (born 1939)
 Mahasi Sayadaw (1904–1982)
 Mother Sayamagyi (1925–2017)
 Ñāṇamoli Bhikkhu (1905–1960)
 Nyānaponika Mahāthera (1901–1994)
 Nyānatiloka Mahāthera (1878–1957)
 Ñāṇavīra Thera (1920–1965)
 Narada Maha Thera (1898–1983)
 Phra Paisal Visalo (born 1957)
 Piyadassi Maha Thera (1914–1998)
 Preah Maha Ghosananda (1929–2007)
 Sayagyi U Ba Khin (1899–1971)
 S. N. Goenka (1924–2013)
 Sharon Salzberg (born 1952)
 Sujiva (born 1951)
 Thanissaro Bhikkhu (born 1949)
 Yuttadhammo Bhikkhu (born 1979)

Tibetan Buddhist teachers

 Anagarika Govinda (1898–1985)
 B. Alan Wallace (born 1950)
 Chagdud Tulku Rinpoche (1930–2002)
 Chögyam Trungpa Rinpoche (1940–1987)
 Chökyi Nyima Rinpoche (born 1951)
 Damba Ayusheev, the XXIV Pandito Khambo Lama in Russia (born 1962)
 Dhardo Rimpoche (1917–1990)
 Dilgo Khyentse (1910–1991)
 Dudjom Jigdral Yeshe Dorje (1904–1987)
 Gyaincain Norbu, the 11th Panchen Lama (controversial; born 1990)
 Kalu Rinpoche (1905–1989)
 Karma Thinley Rinpoche (born 1931)
 Kelsang Gyatso (born 1931)
 Matthieu Ricard (born 1946)
 Ole Nydahl (born 1941)
 Rangjung Rigpe Dorje, 16th Karmapa (1924–1981)
 Sakyong Mipham (born 1962)
 14th Dalai Lama (born 1935)
 Tenzin Palmo (born 1943)
 Thubten Yeshe (known as Lama Yeshe; 1935–1984), Tibetan lama who, while exiled in Nepal, co-founded Kopan Monastery (1969) and the Foundation for the Preservation of the Mahayana Tradition (1975). He followed the Gelug tradition.
 Thubten Zopa Rinpoche
 Trijang Lobsang Yeshe Tenzin Gyatso (1901–1981)
 Tsoknyi Rinpoche (born 1966)
 Tulku Urgyen Rinpoche (1920–1996), Dzogchen, Mahamudra and the Chokling Tersar
 Yongey Mingyur Rinpoche (born 1975)
 Gelek Rimpoche (born 1939)
 Tsem Tulku Rinpoche (born 1965)
 Dagyab Kyabgoen Rinpoche (born 1940)
 Yongey Mingyur Rinpoche (born 1975)
 Sakya Trizin
 Thubten Chodron (born 1950)
 Pema Chödrön (born 1936)
 Robina Courtin (born 1944)
 Robert Thurman (born 1941)
 Mark Epstein (born 1953)

Dzogchen and Bon teachers

 Namkhai Norbu (1938–2018)
 Tenzin Wangyal Rinpoche (born 1961)

Zen teachers

American
 Adyashanti (born 1962)
 Robert Baker Aitken (1917–2010)
 Anne Hopkins Aitken (1911–1994)
 Reb Anderson (born 1943)
 Zentatsu Richard Baker (born 1936)
 Joko Beck (1917–2011)
 Sherry Chayat (born 1943)
 Issan Dorsey (1933–1990)
 Zoketsu Norman Fischer (born 1946)
 James Ishmael Ford (born 1948)
 Tetsugen Bernard Glassman (1939–2018)
 Paul Haller
 Cheri Huber (born 1944)
 Soenghyang (Barbara Rhodes, born 1948)
 Philip Kapleau (1912–2004)
 Houn Jiyu-Kennett (1924–1996)
 Bodhin Kjolhede (born 1948)
 Jakusho Kwong (born 1935)
 Taigen Dan Leighton (born 1950)
 Frederick Lenz (1950–1998)
 John Daido Loori (1931–2009)
 Dai Bai Zan Cho Bo Zen Ji (born 1954)
 Heng Sure (born 1949)
 Bonnie Myotai Treace (born 1956)
 Brad Warner (born 1964)
 Robert J. Waldinger (born 1951)

Chinese
 Fayun (1933–2003)
 Hsu Yun (1840–1959)
 Hsuan Hua (1918–1995)
 Nan Huai-Chin (1918–2012)

European
 John Crook (1930–2011)
 U Dhammaloka (1856?–1914?)
 John Garrie (1923–1998)
 Muhō Noelke (born 1968)

Japanese
 Kōbun Chino Otogawa (1938–2002)
 Taisen Deshimaru (1914–1982)
 Hakuin Ekaku (1686–1769)
 Keido Fukushima (1933–2011)
 Jakushitsu Genkō (1290–1367)
 Shodo Harada (born 1940)
 Harada Daiun Sogaku (1871–1961)
 Dainin Katagiri (1928–1990)
 Musō Soseki (1275–1351)
 Imakita Kosen (1816–1892)
 Yamada Koun (1907–1989)
 Taizan Maezumi (1931–1995)
 Sōyū Matsuoka (?–1998)
 Sōkō Morinaga (1925–1995)
 Soen Nakagawa (1907–1984)
 Gudō Wafu Nishijima (1919–2014)
 Shōhaku Okumura (born 1948)
 Kōdō Sawaki (1880–1965)
 Nyogen Senzaki (1876–1958)
 Oda Sessō (1901–1966)
 Soyen Shaku (1859–1919)
 Zenkei Shibayama (1894–1974)
 Eido Tai Shimano (1932–2018)
 Omori Sogen (1904–1994)
 D. T. Suzuki (1870–1966)
 Shunryū Suzuki (1904–1971)
 Dai Bai Zan Cho Bo Zen Ji (born 1933)
 Bassui Tokushō (1327–1387)
 Sesshū Tōyō (1420–1506)
 Sobin Yamada
 Hakuun Yasutani (1885–1973)
 Bankei Yōtaku (1622–1693)
 Sesson Yūbai (1290–1348)

Korean
 Seongcheol (1912–1993)
 Seungsahn (1927–2004)
 Pomnyun (born 1953)

Malaysian
 Chi Chern (born 1955)

Taiwanese
 Guang Qin (1892–1986), founder of Cheng Tian Temple in Taiwan
 Yin Shun (1906–2005), founder of Humanistic Buddhism
 Sheng-yen (1931–2009), founder of Dharma Drum Mountain in Taiwan
 Cheng Yen (born 1937), founder of Tzu Chi Foundation in Taiwan
 Hsing Yun (born 1927), founder of Fo Guang Shan in Taiwan
 Wei Chueh (born 1928), founder of Chung Tai Shan in Taiwan

Vietnamese
 Thích Nhất Hạnh (1926–2022)
 Thích Chân Không (born 1938)
 Thích Thiên-Ân (1926–1980)
 Thích Thanh Từ (born 1924)

Writers 

 Bhikkhu Analayo (born 1962), known for his comparative studies of early Buddhist texts as preserved by the various early Buddhist traditions
 Buddhādasa Bhikkhu, his works take up an entire room in the National Library of Thailand, and inspired a group of Thai social activists and artists of the 20th century
 Ñāṇamoli Bhikkhu (1905–1960), remembered for his reliable translations from the Pali into English, remarkable command of the Pali language and a wide knowledge of the canonical scriptures
 Ṭhānissaro Bhikkhu (born 1949), known for his translations of almost 1000 Sutta in all and providing the majority of the sutta translations in a website known as "Access to Insight"
 Yuttadhammo Bhikkhu, (born 1979), facilitates a meditation website for groups and individuals, maintains a YouTube channel where hosts both live chatrooms and pre-recorded videos answering viewers' questions about Theravada Buddhism
 Bhikkhu Bodhi (born 1944), second president of the Buddhist Publication Society and has edited and authored several publications grounded in the Theravada Buddhist tradition
 Tara Brach (born 1953), American psychologist and author
 Tanaka Chigaku (1861–1939)
 John Crook (1930–2011), British ecologist, sociologist, and practitioner of both Ch'an and Tibetan Buddhism tradition
 Ven. K. Sri Dhammananda (1919–2006), Buddhist monk and scholar. in Malaysia, wrote approximately 60 Buddhist works, ranging from small pamphlets to texts of over 700 pages
 Phra Dhammavisuddhikavi (born 1936), ex-Vice Rector for Academic Affairs at Mahamakut Buddhist University and has written 70 books on Buddhism
 Allen Ginsberg, poet (Tibetan Buddhism)
 Joseph Goldstein (born 1944), one of the first American Vipassana teachers, contemporary author of numerous popular books on Buddhism
 Nakamura Hajime (1911–1999)
 Chittadhar Hridaya (1906–1982)
 Hsuan Hua (1918–1995), Tripitaka Master; extensive English commentaries on the major Mahayana Sutras: Avatamsaka Sutra, Shurangama Sutra, Shurangama Mantra, Lotus Sutra, Diamond Sutra, and many others
 Christmas Humphreys (1901–1983)
 Daisaku Ikeda (born 1928), prolific writer of Nichiren Buddhism, society, peace and nuclear abolition, and President of the Soka Gakkai International
 Nishitani Keiji (1900–1990)
 Jack Kerouac, American novelist (Zen and Tibetan Buddhism; also the Catholic Church)
 Nishida Kitaro (1870–1945)
 Jack Kornfield (born 1945), American book writer, student of renowned forest monk Ajahn Chah, and teacher of Theravada Buddhism
 Noah Levine (born 1971), American Buddhist teacher and author
 Nyanatiloka Mahathera, (1878–1957), translated several important Theravadin Pali texts into German, also wrote a Pali grammar, an anthology, and a Buddhist dictionary
 Tsunesaburo Makiguchi (1871–1944), Japanese educator and founder of the Soka Gakkai
 Edward Salim Michael (1921–2006), composer and author
 Achan Sobin S. Namto (born 1931), taught Vipassana meditation and Buddhist psychology in Southeast Asia and North America for over 50 years
 Gudo Wafu Nishijima (1919–2014)
 Henry Steel Olcott (1832–1907), major revivalist of Buddhism in Sri Lanka and a Buddhist modernist for his efforts in interpreting Buddhism through a Westernized lens
 Kenneth Pai, Chinese-American writer
 P. A. Payutto (born 1937), lectured and written extensively about a variety of topics related to Buddhism, awarded the 1994 UNESCO Prize for Peace Education
 Sharon Salzberg (born 1953), teacher of Buddhist meditation practices in the West, and also a New York Times best-selling author
 Sangharakshita (1925–2018), founder of the Triratna Buddhist community
 Sheng-yen (1930–2009), religious scholar, one of the most respected teachers of Chinese Ch'an (Zen) Buddhism, and founder of spiritual and educational organization Dharma Drum Mountain
 Yin Shun (1906–2005), brought forth the ideal of "Humanistic" (human-realm) Buddhism and regenerated the interests in the long-ignored Āgamas among Chinese Buddhists
 Shunryū Suzuki (1904–1971), Sōtō Zen monk and teacher who helped popularize Zen Buddhism in the United States
 Taixu (1890–1947), activist and thinker who advocated the reform and renewal of Chinese Buddhism
 Nyanaponika Thera (1901–1994), co-founder of the Buddhist Publication Society, contemporary author of numerous seminal Theravada books
 Robert Thurman (born 1941), American author, editor and translator of books on Tibetan Buddhism, Je Tsongkhapa professor of Indo-Tibetan Buddhist Studies at Columbia University and co-founder and president of Tibet House U.S.
 Josei Toda (1900–1958), peace activist and second president of the Soka Gakkai
 Phra Paisal Visalo, writing and editing books on environment and Buddhism, co-founder of Sekiyadhamma, a network of socially engaged monks in Thailand
 Brad Warner (born 1964), American monk, writer, and musician
 Alan Watts (1915–1973), English writer and lecturer
 Robert Wright (born 1957), American journalist and author. (Zen)
 Han Yong-un (1879–1944), Korean Buddhist reformer and poet

Politicians and activists

Indian 
 B. R. Ambedkar (1891–1956), Indian nationalist, jurist, scholar, political leader, anthropologist, economist and architect of the Constitution of India
 Prakash (Balasaheb) Ambedkar (born 1954), Indian politician, grandson of Dr. Babasaheb Ambedkar
 Ramdas Athawale (born 1959), Indian politician
 Udit Raj (born 1958), Indian politician and member of Indian National Congress. Raj, a Dalit, converted from Hinduism to Buddhism in 2001.
 Kiren Rijiju (born 1971), Indian politician
 Kanshi Ram Founder of Bahujan Samaj Party

Malaysian 
 Tan Cheng Lock (1883–1960), Malaysian nationalist, businessman and founder of Malaysian Chinese Association, key figure in the independence of Malaysia.

Japanese 
 Morihiro Hosokawa, is a Japanese politician and noble who was Prime Minister of Japan from 1993 to 1994, leading a coalition government which was the first non-Liberal Democratic Party (LDP) government of Japan since 1955.

Burmese
 Aung San Suu Kyi (born 1945), Burmese opposition politician and chairperson of the National League for Democracy (NLD) in Burma; received the Rafto Prize and the Sakharov Prize in 1990 and the Nobel Peace Prize in 1991 (Theravada)
 U Nu (1997–1995), Prime Minister of Burma and facilitator of Sixth Buddhist Council
 U Thant (1909–1974), Burmese diplomat and third Secretary-General of the United Nations (1961–1971) (Theravada)
 Win Ko Ko Latt (born 1982), Burmese ultranationalist

American

 Bill Clinton, 42nd U.S. president from (1993-2001)
 Colleen Hanabusa (born 1951), U.S. Congresswoman and lawyer from Hawaii
 Mazie Hirono (born 1947), U.S. Senator, U.S. Congresswoman from Hawaii; the nation's first Buddhist senator
 David Ige (born 1957), American politician and the eighth governor of Hawaii
 Hank Johnson (born 1954), U.S. Congressman from Georgia; one of the first two Buddhists to serve in the United States Congress (Soka Gakkai International)

English

 Eric Lubbock, 4th Baron Avebury (1928–2016), English politician; served as the Liberal Member of Parliament for Orpington and served in the House of Lords, having inherited the title of Baron Avebury in 1971 (Secular Buddhism)
 Suella Braverman is a British barrister and politician who has served as Home Secretary since 25 October 2022. She previously held the position from 6 September to 19 October 2022 under Liz Truss. A member of the Conservative Party, she was chair of the European Research Group from 2017 to 2018 and attorney general for England and Wales from 2020 to 2022. She has been the member of Parliament (MP) for Fareham in Hampshire since 2015. She took her oath of office on the Dhammapada.

South Korean
 Jiyul (born 1957), Buddhist nun from South Korea who fasted to stop destruction of Korean salamander lands (Korean Seon)
 Pomnyun (born 1953), South Korean Buddhist monk, Zen master, and peace activist who received the Ramon Magsaysay Award for Peace and International Understanding in 2002 for his peace activism on the issue of Korean peninsula. (Korean Seon)

Vietnamese
 Thích Huyền Quang (1919–2008), Vietnamese Buddhist monk, dissident and activist; formerly the patriarch of the Unified Buddhist Sangha of Vietnam; in 2002, he was awarded the Homo Homini Award for his human rights activism by the Czech group People in Need
 Thích Quảng Độ, Vietnamese Buddhist monk, current patriarch of the Unified Buddhist Sangha of Vietnam; awarded the Homo Homini Award for human rights activism by the Czech group People in Need in 2002; nine-time Nobel Peace Prize nominee
 Thích Quảng Đức (1897–1963), Vietnamese Mahayana monk and self-martyr for freedom of religion; burned himself to death at a busy Saigon road intersection on 11 June 1963 (Mahayana)

Sri Lankan 
 D. S. Senanayake (1883–1952), Prime Minister of Ceylon
 S. W. R. D. Bandaranaike (1899–1959), Prime Minister of Ceylon
 Sirimavo Bandaranaike (1916–2000), Prime Minister of Sri Lanka and first female Prime Minister in the world.

Film and television

American 

 Dan Harris (born 1971), American meditation teacher and retired journalist
 Jennifer Aniston (born 1965), American actress and producer (Zen)
 John Astin (born 1930), American actor
 Kate Bosworth, American actress (Soka Gakkai International)
 Jeff Bridges (born 1949), American actor; he has elaborated that his Buddhism is more like a general calmness. (Zen)
 Drew Carey (born 1958), American actor, comedian, game show host and photographer. (Theravada)
 Peter Coyote (born 1941), American actor and author
 Robert Downey Junior (born 1965), American Jewish Buddhist actor; he has said many times that Buddhism has helped him with his drug and alcohol addiction. (Theravada)
 Patrick Duffy (born 1949), American actor and director. The actor was brought closer to the teachings of Buddhism by his late wife, the ballet dancer Carlyn Rosser (1939–2017). He has been practicing the religion for almost 50 years  and describes it as an "essential part" of his life. (Soka Gakkai International)
 Chris Evans (born 1981), American actor and a student of Indian Buddhism. He spent three weeks in Rishikesh in 2005 or 2006 at a Buddhist retreat and attends a Buddhism class in LA. (Theravada)
 Richard Gere (born 1949), American actor (Tibetan Buddhism)
 Ron Glass (1945–2016), American actor and comedian.
 Kate Hudson (born 1979), American actress and businesswoman. (Zen)
 Michael Imperioli (born 1966), American actor, writer, director and musician. In 2008, Imperioli became a Buddhist.
 Chris Kattan (born 1970), American actor, comedian and author. (Tibetan Buddhism)
 David Labrava (born 1962), actor, writer, tattoo artist, former member of the Hells Angels, and motorcycle enthusiast. (Zen)
 Celeste Lecesne (born 1954), American actor, author, screenwriter, LGBT rights activist, founder of The Trevor Project (Soka Gakkai International)
 Anthony Lee (1981–2000), American actor and playwright. (Soka Gakkai International)
 Mandy Patinkin (born 1952), American actor and singer known for his work in musical theatre, television and film.
 Elliot Page (born 1987), American-Canadian actor and activist. (Tibetan Buddhism)
 Jeremy Piven (born 1965), American actor, comedian and producer. (Zen)
 Steven Seagal (born 1952), American actor and aikido expert (Tibetan Buddhism)
 Garry Shandling (1949–2016), American actor and comedian. (Zen)
 Martin Starr (born 1983), American actor and comedian. (Theravada)
 Oliver Stone, American film director
 Sharon Stone, American actress, producer, and former fashion model
 George Takei (born 1937), American actor and author (Zen)
 Duncan Trusell (born 1974), American actor and stand-up comic (Tibetan Buddhism)
 Marcia Wallace, American actress, voice artist, comedian (Soka Gakkai International)

Brazilian 
 Edson Celulari (born 1958), Brazilian actor
 Carmo Dalla Vecchia (born 1971), Brazilian actor.
 João Vitti (born 1967), Brazilian theatre and telenovela actor.

British
 Adewale Akinnuoye-Agbaje (born 1967), British-Nigerian actor best known for his roles on television (Soka Gakkai International)
 Tom Baker (born 1934), British actor and writer.
 Orlando Bloom (born 1977), English actor known for his roles in film. (Soka Gakkai International)
 Russell Brand (born 1975), British comedian, actor, and television and radio host (Tibetan Buddhism)
 Benedict Cumberbatch (born 1976), British actor (Theravada).
 John Cleese (born 1939), British actor and comedian.
 Peter Dean (born 1939), British actor (Zen)
 Chris Gascoyne (born 1968), English actor (Theravada)
 Claudia Jessie, British actress (Soka Gakkai International) 
 Barry Letts (1925–2009), English actor, television director, writer and producer 
 Thandiwe Newton (born 1972), English actress. (Theravada) 
 Naomi Watts, British-Australian actress and film producer

Chinese 

 Chow Yun-fat, Chinese actor

Danish 

 Anne Louise Hassing, Danish actress (Soka Gakkai International)

Indian 

 Kushal Badrike, actor, comedian
 Tisca Chopra, Indian actress (Soka Gakkai International)
 Bhalchandra Kadam (born 1970), actor, comedian
 Shraddha Das, Indian actress and model (Theravada)
 Ravi Dubey (born 1983), Indian Nichiren Buddhist actor, model and producer. He said, "I started following Buddhism when I was going through a very rough patch in my life and I wanted some understanding of the chaos that was going on in one's life. I wanted to align myself and feel better about myself. So, when things went out of control, I started chanting at that time." (Nichiren Buddhism)
 Manav Gohil (born 1974), Indian actor and producer. (Nichiren Buddhism).
 Tusshar Kapoor (born 1976), Indian Bollywood actor and producer. (Nichiren Buddhism)
 Ayushman Khurrana (born 1984), Indian film actor and activist. He and his wife Tahira Kashyap are followers of Nichiren Buddhism, which they state has helped them through a cancer diagnosis. (Niciren Buddhism)
 Gagan Malik (born 1976), Indian actor. (Theravada)
 Hansika Motwani, Indian actress. She has said in an interview, "The best way to effectively de-stress for me is to chant- Nam Myo Ho Renge Kyo, as I strongly follow Buddhism." (Tibetan Buddhism)
 Abhijeet Sawant (born 1981), actor and singer

Italian 
 Marco Columbro (born 1950), Italian actor and television host. (Tibetan Buddhism)
 Manuel De Peppe (born 1970), Italian actor, producer and singer, converted to Buddhism in 2011. (Secular Buddhism)

Malaysian 

 Michelle Yeoh, Malaysian actress

Thai 

 Napapa Tantrakul (born 1986), Thai actress

Billionaire

American 
 Jack Dorsey (born 1976), American technological entrepreneur and philanthropist. (Theravada)
 Steve Jobs (1955–2011), American businessman, entrepreneur, marketer, and inventor. (Zen)

English
 Andy Puddicombe (born 23 September 1972) is a British author, public speaker and a teacher of meditation and mindfulness. He, alongside Richard Pierson, is the co-founder of Headspace, a digital health company that provides guided meditation training and mindfulness for its users.

Music

American 

 John Cage, American composer (Zen Buddhism)
 Belinda Carlisle, American singer (Soka Gakkai International)
 Philip Glass, American composer (Tibetan Buddhist)
 Herbie Hancock, American pianist and composer (Soka Gakkai International)
 Combat Jack (known professionally as Combat Jack; 1964–2017), Haitian-American hip hop music attorney, executive, journalist, editor and podcaster.
 Courtney Love, American singer-songwriter (Soka Gakkai International)
 Steven Sater, American playwright, lyricist and screenwriter (Soka Gakkai International)
 Duncan Sheik (born 1969), American singer-songwriter and composer (Soka Gakkai International)
 Earl Sweatshirt, American rapper, songwriter, and record producer. (Nichiren Buddhism)
 Tina Turner, American singer-songwriter (Soka Gakkai International)
 Buster Williams (born 1942), American jazz bassist
 Adam Yauch (stage name MCA; 1964–2012), American rapper, bass player, filmmaker.

Australian 

 Jimmy Barnes (born 1956), Australian singer

British 
 David Bowie (1947–2016), English singer-songwriter and actor.
 Boy George (born 1961), English singer, songwriter, DJ, fashion designer, mixed media artist, photographer and record producer (Soka Gakkai International)
 Maxi Jazz (born 1957), British rapper
 Howard Jones (born 1955), English musician, singer and songwriter

Canadian 
 Beverly Glenn-Copeland (born 1944), U.S.-born Canadian musician, songwriter and singer (Soka Gakkai International)
 Leonard Cohen, Canadian singer-songwriter/poet (Zen)
 k.d. lang (born 1961), Canadian singer (Tibetan Buddhism)

Chinese 
 Faye Wong (born 1969), Chinese singer and actress (Tibetan Buddhism)

Hong Konger 
 Daniel Chan (born 1975), Hong Kong singer, songwriter, and actor. (Chan Buddhism)

Indian 

 Vaishali Mhade (born 1984), singer
 Shibani Kashyap, Indian singer
 Abhijeet Kosambi, singer
 Surekha Punekar, Indian folk artist
 Adarsh Shinde (born 1988), singer, musician
 Vitthal Umap (1931–2010), singer

Italian 
 Carmen Consoli, Italian singer and songwriter

Sport

Football
 Brett Kirk (born 1976), former Australian rules football player and current assistant coach.
 Fabien Barthez (1994–2006), French goalkeeper (Zen). He is the first Buddhist (Zen) Practicing footballer in the world to win the WorldCup and Euro. 
 Kim Do-hoon,(born 21 July 1970) is a South Korean professional football manager and former player. He was most recently the manager of Singaporean club Lion City Sailors before his 11 August 2022 resignation.
 Kim Eun-jung ,(born 8 April 1979) is a South Korean retired footballer who played as a striker. He is currently a coach at Tubize after joining the team in 2015 as a youth scout.
 Mehmet Scholl German football manager and former player.
 Park Ji-sung, is a South Korean former professional footballer who played as a midfielder. Park is the most successful Asian player in football history, having won 19 trophies in his career. He is the first Asian footballer to have won the UEFA Champions League, to play in a UEFA Champions League final, as well as the first Asian to have won the FIFA Club World Cup.
 Shunsuke Nakamura (born 1978), Japanese soccer player
 Sébastien Frey (born 1980), French former professional footballer who played as a goalkeeper. Frey has credited former Fiorentina legend Roberto Baggio as one of his spiritual mentors. (Soka Gakkai International)
 Roberto Baggio (1988–2004), Italian footballer (Soka Gakkai International) 
 Mario Balotelli Barwuah (born 1990), Italian professional footballer. He is studying Buddhism in a bid to find inner peace and has bought several copies of the dharma, the religion's teachings, and set up a quiet area with a statue of Buddha where he can meditate. (Pure Land Buddhism)
Mehmet Scholl (born 1970), German football manager and former player. (Theravada)

Cricket

 Mahela Jayawardene (born 1977), Sri Lankan former cricketer and consultant coach.
 Kumar Sangakkara (born 1977), Sri Lankan cricket commentator, former professional cricketer, and businessman. (Theravada)
 Lasith Malinga (born 1981), Sri Lankan professional cricket player and Captain of T20 International cricket of Sri Lanka. (Theravada)
 Sanath Jayasuriya (born 1969), Sri Lankan batter.
 Tillakaratne Dilshan (born 1976), Sri Lankan cricket player who converted from Islam to Buddhism at the age of 16, previously known as Tuwan Muhammad Dilshan. (Theravada)
 Tillakaratne Sampath (born 1982), Sri Lankan cricket player previously known as Tuwan Mohammad Nishan Sampath
 Suraj Randiv (born 1985), Sri Lankan cricket player. (Theravada)

Basketball 
 Phil Jackson (born 1945), American former professional basketball player, coach, and executive.

Swimming 
 Anthony Ervin (born 1981), American gold medalist swimmer. (Zen)

Rugby 
 Jonny Wilkinson (born 1979), English former rugby union player. (Thravada)
 Ricky Evans (born 1960), Welsh former international rugby union player.

Golf 
 Tiger Woods, American golfer (Theravada)

Boxing 
 Lucia Rijker, Dutch boxer

Wrestlers 
 Kim Hyeon-woo (born November 6, 1988 in Wonju, Gangwon-do) is a male wrestler from South Korea. In the 2012 Summer Olympics, Kim won the gold medal in the 66 kg Greco-Roman wrestling final.
 Matt Sydal, is an American professional wrestler currently signed to All Elite Wrestling (AEW).

Military

American 
 Aidan Delgado, American attorney, author, and war veteran
 George Lennon (1900 – 1991), American-Irish Republican Army leader during the Irish War of Independence and the Irish Civil War (Zen)
 John David Provoo (1917 – 2001), United States Army staff sergeant.
 Shiro Kashiwa (1912 – 1998), first Attorney General of Hawaii to be appointed after it became a state in 1959 (Jōdo Shinshū)
 Ming Chang – rear admiral (upper half), U.S. Navy, retired. Department of Navy Inspector General, 1987–1990
 Ellison Onizuka (1946–1986), U.S. Air Force Colonel and first Asian American astronaut of NASA (Pure Land Buddhism)

Buddhist practitioners notable in other fields 

 Penélope Cruz, Spanish actress and model
 George Dvorsky, Transhumanist, Futurist and a director of Humanity+ (Secular Buddhism)
 Jet Li, Chinese martial artist, Hollywood actor (Tibetan Buddhist)
 Naima Mora, American fashion model and winner of America's Next Top Model (Soka Gakkai International)
 Maya Soetoro-Ng, Indonesian American writer, university instructor and maternal half-sister of Barack Obama, the 44th President of the United States
Priscilla Chan, pediatrician and philanthropist, wife of Facebook founder Mark Zuckerberg

Fictional Buddhists

Anime and manga
Gautama Buddha, protagonist from Saint Young Men
The cast from Ah My Buddha
Ikkyū, protagonist from Ikkyū-san
The cast from Oseam
Seishin Muroi, character from Shiki
Yoh Asakura, protagonist of the anime/manga Shaman King
Hanamaru Kunikida, character from Love Live! Sunshine!!
Miroku, character from Japanese Anime Inuyasha
Krillin, character from the Dragonball series
Kaname Asahina, Chiaki and Yūsei, characters from Brothers Conflict
Chichiri, character from Fushigi Yūgi
Yakumo Kokonoe, character from The Irregular at Magic High School
Mayura Sōda, Miyuki Sagara, and Yukimasa Sagara, characters from RDG: Red Data Girl
Keisei Tagami and Akasha Shishidō, characters from the Corpse Princess series
Anji Yūkyūzan, character from Rurouni Kenshin
Enkai, character from Requiem from the Darkness

Graphic novels
 Enigma, Marvel Comics superheroine
 Xorn, Marvel Comics character and member of the X-Men
 Green Lama, American pulp magazine hero
 Green Arrow (Connor Hawke), DC Comics superhero

Literature
 Sun Wukong, Monkey King in Chinese epic novel Journey to the West, and a fictional pupil of historical Chinese monk Xuanzang
 Mary Elizabeth, character from the novel The Perks of Being a Wallflower

Film and television
 Steve Jinks, character from Warehouse 13, (Season 3, Episode 1) "The New Guy"
 Daryl Dixon, character from The Walking Dead, Episode 8 (Season 2, Episode 2) "Bloodletting"
 Kahn Souphanousinphone, character from the cartoon King of the Hill
 Connie Souphanousinphone, character from the cartoon King of the Hill
 Dale Cooper, protagonist of the television series Twin Peaks
 Kyle Valenti, character from the television series Roswell
 Lisa Simpson, feminist and daughter of Homer and Marge Simpson, character from the cartoon The Simpsons Episode 275 (Season 13 Episode 6) "She of Little Faith"
 Lenny and Carl and Carl Carlson, and Lenny Leonard
 Trini Kwan, original Yellow Ranger of the Mighty Morphin Power Rangers
 Wendy Wu, protagonist of the Disney Channel Original Movie Wendy Wu: Homecoming Warrior
 Master Splinter, Zen sensei/teacher to the Teenage Mutant Ninja Turtles
 Hiro Nakamura, protagonist character in TV series Heroes
 Gi, Planeteer able to wield the element water
 Edina Monsoon (Eddy) from the Absolutely Fabulous TV sitcom
 The God character in South Park, episode "Probably"
 Charlie Crews, Zen Buddhist, protagonist of television series Life
 Buddha, character from Air Buddies
 Satomi Ito, Alpha Werewolf and leader of Buddhist werewolf pack in the television series Teen Wolf (2011 TV series)

Video games
 Liu Kang, character from the video game and later movie, Mortal Kombat
 Sage, a class of trainer from the Pokémon series

Misc
 2D, lead singer and keyboardist of the British virtual band Gorillaz
 Jeremy, from the popular web series Pure Pwnage

See also
 Awgatha
 Three Refuges
 Five precepts
 Dalit Buddhist movement
 Jewish Buddhists
 List of American Buddhists
 List of Marathi Buddhists
 List of converts to Buddhism
 List of converts to Buddhism from Christianity
 List of converts to Buddhism from Hinduism
 Outline of Buddhism

References

External links 

 
Lists of religious people lists
 
Rinpoches